George R. Cogar (born 1932–disappeared 1983) was the head of the UNIVAC 1004 electronic design team code named the "bumblebee project", and later the "barn project", and co-founder of Mohawk Data Sciences Corporation, a Herkimer, N.Y.-based multimillion-dollar business. His most successful invention was the Data Recorder magnetic tape encoder, which was introduced in 1965 and eliminated the need for keypunches and punched cards by direct encoding on tape. He also founded the Cogar Corporation, where he built an intelligent terminal—an early forerunner of the modern personal computer—which he called the Cogar System 4 or Cogar 4. The Cogar 4 became the Singer 1500 after Singer Business Machines acquired Cogar Corporation. In 1976 International Computers Limited (ICL) acquired Singer Business Machines, changing the name of the computer to the ICL 1500.

Disappearance
Cogar was last seen Friday, September 2, 1983, when a private plane, a Britten-Norman Islander, went down somewhere in British Columbia, Canada.

Philanthropy
Cogar and his wife Ann established the Cogar Foundation for the express purpose of awarding grants and scholarships to students of Herkimer County. The Cogar Gallery at Herkimer County Community College is named for them.

Patents

See also
International Computers Limited
List of people who disappeared
MDS 2400
Singer Corporation

References

External links
 https://georgecogar.com/

1932 births
American computer scientists
Missing aviators
Missing person cases in Canada
Possibly living people